1216 Askania, provisional designation , is a stony Florian asteroid from the inner regions of the asteroid belt, approximately 9 kilometers in diameter. It was discovered on 29 January 1932, by German astronomer Karl Reinmuth at Heidelberg Observatory in southwest Germany. It was named after the company Askania Werke, a German manufacturer of precision instruments.

Orbit and classification 

Askania orbits the Sun in the inner main-belt at a distance of 1.8–2.6 AU once every 3 years and 4 months (1,219 days). Its orbit has an eccentricity of 0.18 and an inclination of 8° with respect to the ecliptic. The asteroid is a member of the Flora family, one of the largest families in the asteroid belt. Conversely, it is considered a background asteroid when applying the hierarchical clustering method to it proper orbital elements.

The body's observation arc begins with its official discovery observation at Heidelberg in 1932.

Naming 

The minor planet was named after "Askania Werke AG", a manufacturer of optical and astronomical instruments in Berlin (also see Cinetheodolite). The company went on to develop the auto pilot of the V-1 bomb in the following years. The official naming citation was published by Paul Herget in The Names of the Minor Planets in 1955.

Physical characteristics 

In the Tholen classification, Askania is a common stony S-type asteroid.

Lightcurves 

Lightcurve observations of Askania at the Menke Observatory in July 2006, show a well-defined periodicity of  hours, during which time the brightness of the body varies by  magnitude.

Diameter and albedo 

According to the surveys carried out by the Japanese Akari satellite, and the NEOWISE mission of NASA's Wide-field Infrared Survey Explorer, Askania measures between 7.21 and 10.533 kilometers in diameter and its surface has an albedo between  0.064 and 0.15.

The Collaborative Asteroid Lightcurve Link assumes an albedo of 0.24 – derived from 8 Flora, an stony asteroid and largest member and namesake of the Flora family – and calculates a diameter of 5.44 kilometers with an absolute magnitude of 13.49.

Notes

References

External links 
   
 Asteroid Lightcurve Database (LCDB), query form (info )
 Dictionary of Minor Planet Names, Google books
 Asteroids and comets rotation curves, CdR – Observatoire de Genève, Raoul Behrend
 Discovery Circumstances: Numbered Minor Planets (1)-(5000) – Minor Planet Center
 
 

001216
Discoveries by Karl Wilhelm Reinmuth
Named minor planets
001216
19320129